The Men's European Volleyball League is a continental volleyball competition senior men's national volleyball teams of Europe, organized by the European Volleyball Confederation (CEV). Created in 2004, the competition serves as a qualifying tournament for the FIVB World League (until 2017) and to its successor the FIVB Nations League since 2018.

This event should not be confused with the other, more prestigious, continental competition for European national volleyball teams, the European Volleyball Championship.

Results summary

Medals summary

MVP by edition
2004 –  Petr Pláteník
2005 –  Pavel Abramov 
2006 –  Guido Görtzen 
2007 –  Guillermo Falasca 
2008 –  Martin Sopko 
2009 –  Jochen Schöps 
2010 –  Valdir Sequeira 
2011 –  Tomas Kmet 
2012 –  Emre Batur 
2013 –  Bram Van den Dries 
2014 –  Miloš Ćulafić 
2015 –  Dejan Vinčič 
2016 –  Robert Täht 
2017 –  Maksym Drozd 
2018 –  Renee Teppan 
2019 –  Arslan Ekşi
2021 –  Adis Lagumdzija
2022 –  Jan Galabov

See also

 European Women's Volleyball League
 Men's European Volleyball Championship
 FIVB Volleyball World League

References

External links
 Official website

 
V
European volleyball records and statistics
Volleyball competitions in Europe
International volleyball competitions
Annual sporting events
2004 establishments in Europe